The Women's Downhill in the 2022 FIS Alpine Skiing World Cup consisted of nine events including the finals. Defending champion Sofia Goggia of Italy, who won four of the five downhills in which she competed in 2020-21, continued her domination in 2021-22 by again winning four of the first five downhills. Goggia took a commanding lead in the discipline after American Breezy Johnson, who finished second in each of the first three downhills, missed the rest of the season with a knee injury. Goggia then suffered her own knee injury, including a broken bone and ligament tears, while training for the last downhill prior to the 2022 Winter Olympics, but she was able to continue competing within a month and, after all but the final race of the season, had such a commanding lead that only one other competitor (Corinne Suter of Switzerland) even had a theoretical possibility of overtaking her. At the finals, Suter failed to score, and Goggia won her second consecutive (and third overall) discipline championship.

As noted above, the season was interrupted by the 2022 Winter Olympics in Beijing, China (at the Yanqing National Alpine Skiing Centre in Yanqing District) from 6–19 February 2022.  Although the Alpine Skiing branch of the International Ski Federation (FIS) conducts the World Cup and co-organizes the Alpine skiing at the Winter Olympics (along with the International Olympic Committee {IOC)), the Winter Olympics are organized by nation (a maximum of four skiers is permitted per nation), and (after 1968) the Olympic results do not count for World Cup points. Accordingly, the results in the Olympics are highlighted in blue and shown in this table by ordinal position only in each discipline.The women's downhill was held at the "Rock" course on 15 February 2022.

The World Cup final took place on Wednesday, 16 March in the linked resorts of Courchevel and Méribel, France, which are located in Les Trois Vallées, on the L'Eclipse course at Courchevel. Only the top 25 skiers in the World Cup downhill discipline and the winner of the Junior World Championship, plus athletes who have scored at least 500 points in the World Cup overall classification for the season, are eligible to compete in the final, and only the top 15 earn World Cup points. Because of the close race for the overall title, three athletes with 500+ overall points (Mikaela Shiffrin, Petra Vlhová, and Marta Bassino) entered the final, and one of them (Shiffrin, who had only raced two World Cup downhills all year) won it.

Standings

Legend

DNF = Did Not Finish 
DSQ = Disqualified

See also
 2022 Alpine Skiing World Cup – Women's summary rankings
 2022 Alpine Skiing World Cup – Women's Overall
 2022 Alpine Skiing World Cup – Women's Super-G
 2022 Alpine Skiing World Cup – Women's Giant Slalom
 2022 Alpine Skiing World Cup – Women's Slalom
 2022 Alpine Skiing World Cup – Women's Parallel
 World Cup scoring system

References

External links
 Alpine Skiing at FIS website

Women's downhill
FIS Alpine Ski World Cup women's downhill discipline titles